Ole Jørgensen (13 November 1897 – 5 July 1966) was a Norwegian politician for the Labour Party.  He was born in Vennesla in Vest-Agder county, Norway.

Career
His first position in local politics was as a member of the Øvrebø municipal council in 1924–1925. He gradually became mayor of Vennesla municipality during the terms 1945–1947, 1947–1951 and 1951–1955, and his last term came as a regular member in 1955–1959.

He was elected to the Norwegian Parliament from Vest-Agder in 1954, and was re-elected on two occasions as well as in the 1962 revote. He had previously served in the position of deputy representative in the period 1950–1953.

References

1897 births
1966 deaths
Labour Party (Norway) politicians
Members of the Storting
20th-century Norwegian politicians
Place of death missing
People from Vennesla